Amina Haydar al-Sadr, known as Bint al-Huda al-Sadr, was an Iraqi educator and political activist who was executed by Saddam Hussein along with her brother, Ayatullah Sayyid Mohammad Baqir al-Sadr, in 1980.

Life and career
Aminah Haidar al-Sadr was born in 1937 in Kazimiyah, Baghdad where she would eventually establish several religious schools for girls. Bint al-Huda played a significant role in creating Islamic awareness among the Muslim women of Iraq. She was in her twenties when she began writing articles in al-Adwaa, an Islamic magazine printed by the religious intellectuals of Najaf, Iraq, in 1959. She was also well known for her participation in the Safar Uprising in 1977.

Bint al-Huda grew up with a serious love of learning. She soon became aware of what she perceived to be the Muslim women's sufferings and the great disasters which were damaging Islamic ideology in her country.

In 1980, the religious leader Ayatollah Sayyid Mohammad Baqir al-Sadr and his sister, Bint al-Huda, were arrested, brutally tortured and later executed by Saddam Hussein's regime due to their leading role in the opposition to the regime. The regime never returned her body, but her burial site is said to be in Wadi Al-Salam, Najaf.

Works 

 A Word And A Call - first book published in the 1960s
 Virtue Triumphs
 A Lady With The Prophet 
 Two Women And A Man - a story about education and guidance 
 Conflict of reality
 The Searcher Of Truth - published in 1979 
 Memories On The Hills of Mecca - written after her pilgrimage Ito Mecca in 1973
 A Meeting At The Hospital 
 The Lost Aunt
 Had I But Known
 The Game
 The Heroic Muslim Women
 Inner Debate
 The Lost Diary
 Choosing A Wife
 Determination
 Spiritual Journey
 A Bad Bargain
 The Gift
 A Visit To The Bride
 Inner Debate
 The Last Days
 Hard Times
 A New Start
 The Last Hours
 Struggling With Conflict
 Idleness 
 Ingratitude
 Firm Stand
 The Dangerous Game
 A Muslim Student's Diary

See also
Nosrat Amin
Zohreh Sefati
Amina Bint al-Majlisi

References

External links
Safar Uprising

1937 births
1980 deaths
People from Baghdad
Iraqi educators
Iraqi Shia Muslims
20th-century executions by Iraq
Iraqi women writers
Iraqi writers
20th-century women writers
20th-century Iraqi educators
Executed writers
20th-century Iraqi writers
20th-century women educators